The Boardwalk nightclub was located on Little Peter Street in Manchester, England. This medium-sized club and rehearsal studios, owned by David, Colin and Donald Sinclair was a popular live music venue in the late 1980s and early 1990s where bands such as Oasis and Northside made their live debuts. It was also one of Manchester's most prominent nightclubs. 

Along with other clubs like the Haçienda, and the International, the Boardwalk provided an important live venue for many local bands.

The Man From Delmonte, the Charlatans, Happy Mondays, Female Brothers and James, who played the opening night in 1986, were amongst the many Manchester bands that appeared frequently at the Boardwalk before acquiring international recognition or disappearing into obscurity. The venue also saw a variety of other acts including Oasis, Hole, Sonic Youth, Chumbawamba, Jayne County, Verve, Bob Mould and Rage Against the Machine. The Membranes fronted by John Robb who wrote the best selling book on Manchester music 'The North Will Rise Again'  were the first band to rehearse there.

In later years, until the club closed in 1999, former Haçienda DJ Dave Haslam played the regular Yellow night at the Boardwalk. Haslam subsequently wrote a book about the Manchester music scene at the time, Manchester, England.

Funkademia was started by DJ and promoter David Payne at The Boardwalk in 1995 and has since gone on to be Manchester's longest running club night, currently at the Mint Lounge.

The nightclub site now has a blue plaque, featuring a smiley face beneath the description of The Boardwalk as a "Madchester Venue Nightclub and Rehearsal Rooms".

External links
"The Madchester Years" by Marcy Curtis, 80sand90smusic.com

"What’s Become Of 12 Of Britain’s Greatest ‘Lost’ Gig Venues" by Sam Moore, NME

"About Boardwalk (former)", subTOURING

"The lasting legacy of Manchester's long-gone nightclubs" by Louise Rhind-Tutt, inews

References

Boardwalk, The
Music venues in Manchester
Madchester